UFC Fight Night: Holm vs. Correia (also known as UFC Fight Night 111) was a mixed martial arts event produced by the Ultimate Fighting Championship held on June 17, 2017, at Singapore Indoor Stadium in Kallang, Singapore.

Background
The event was the second that the promotion has hosted in Singapore, following UFC Fight Night: Saffiedine vs. Lim which was at the Marina Bay Sands in January 2014.

A women's bantamweight bout between former UFC Women's Bantamweight Champion Holly Holm and former title challenger Bethe Correia headlined this event.

Although the pairing was never officially announced by the promotion, Alex Caceres was linked to a bout with promotional newcomer Wang Guan at the event. Instead, Caceres faced another newcomer in Rolando Dy.

Jonathan Meunier was expected to face Li Jingliang at the event. However, Meunier's removal from the card was announced on June 6 due to an alleged injury and was replaced by promotional newcomer Frank Camacho.

At the weigh-ins, Carls John de Tomas came in at 131 lb, five pounds over the flyweight limit of 126 lb. As a result, he was fined 30% of his purse, which went to Naoki Inoue and their bout proceeded as scheduled at a catchweight.

Results

Bonus awards
The following fighters were awarded $50,000 bonuses:
Fight of the Night: Li Jingliang vs. Frank Camacho
Performance of the Night: Holly Holm and Ulka Sasaki

See also
List of UFC events
2017 in UFC

References

UFC Fight Night
Mixed martial arts in Singapore
2017 in mixed martial arts
Sport in Singapore
2017 in Singapore
June 2017 sports events in Asia